Ernest Frederick Bacon (19 February 1896 – 9 January 1972) was an English professional footballer who played in the Football League for Watford, Charlton Athletic and Leicester City as a right half.

Personal life 
Bacon served in the Royal Garrison Artillery in Salonika during the First World War.

Career statistics

References

1896 births
1972 deaths
English Football League players
English footballers
Footballers from Leicester
Association football utility players
Charlton Athletic F.C. players
Association football wing halves
British Army personnel of World War I
Royal Garrison Artillery soldiers
Leicester City F.C. players
Watford F.C. players
Nuneaton Borough F.C. players
Kettering Town F.C. players
Rothwell Town F.C. players
Erith & Belvedere F.C. players
Military personnel from Leicester